Ashkanan(also Romanized as ashkanan: also known as ashkanan and ‘ashkanan) is a city and capital of Eshkanan District, in Lamerd County, Fars Province, Iran. Previously known as "Sodabgerd". At the 2006 census, its population was 7,513, in 1,516 families.

References

Populated places in Lamerd County

Cities in Fars Province
Lur people